Bartolomeo Rosa (1648–1688) was a Roman Catholic prelate who served as Bishop of Lavello (1688).

Biography
Bartolomeo Rosa was born in Muro Lucano, Italy on 14 July 1648 and ordained a priest on 24 March 1674.
On 17 May 1688, he was appointed during the papacy of Pope Innocent XI as Bishop of Lavello.
On 23 May 1688, he was consecrated bishop by Marcantonio Barbarigo, Bishop of Corneto (Tarquinia) e Montefiascone, with Pietro de Torres, Archbishop of Dubrovnik, and Costanzo Zani, Bishop of Imola, serving as co-consecrators. 
He served as Bishop of Lavello until his death on 21 August 1688.

References

External links and additional sources
 (Chronology of Bishops) 
 (Chronology of Bishops) 

17th-century Italian Roman Catholic bishops
Bishops appointed by Pope Innocent XI
1648 births
1688 deaths